

232001–232100 

|-bgcolor=#f2f2f2
| colspan=4 align=center | 
|}

232101–232200 

|-bgcolor=#f2f2f2
| colspan=4 align=center | 
|}

232201–232300 

|-bgcolor=#f2f2f2
| colspan=4 align=center | 
|}

232301–232400 

|-id=306
| 232306 Bekuška ||  || Rebecca "Bekuška" Morvay (born 2005) is a daughter of Slovak amateur astronomer Eva Morvayová. || 
|}

232401–232500 

|-id=409
| 232409 Dubes ||  || Alain Dubes (1935–2016), a French amateur astronomer || 
|}

232501–232600 

|-id=553
| 232553 Randypeterson ||  || Randy Peterson (born 1948), a visual observer and longtime member of the American East Valley Astronomy Club of Phoenix, Arizona || 
|}

232601–232700 

|-bgcolor=#f2f2f2
| colspan=4 align=center | 
|}

232701–232800 

|-id=763
| 232763 Eliewiesel ||  || Elie Wiesel (1928–2016), a Romanian-born American Jewish writer, human rights activist and recipient of the 1986 Nobel Prize for Peace || 
|}

232801–232900 

|-bgcolor=#f2f2f2
| colspan=4 align=center | 
|}

232901–233000 

|-id=923
| 232923 Adalovelace ||  || Augusta Ada King, Countess of Lovelace (1815–1852), daughter of George Gordon Byron, was an English mathematician and writer known mainly for her work on Babbage's analytical engine. || 
|-id=949
| 232949 Muhina ||  || The Museum of Natural History (Muhina) of Fribourg in Switzerland, founded in 1823, assures the conservation of its collections and offers unique information and research possibilities to researchers. || 
|}

References 

232001-233000